Adams Odd Fellows Hall is located in Adams, Oregon.  It was built in 1886 and added to the National Register of Historic Places on August 5, 1994.

References

1886 establishments in Oregon
Buildings and structures in Umatilla County, Oregon
Clubhouses on the National Register of Historic Places in Oregon
Cultural infrastructure completed in 1886
Italianate architecture in Oregon
National Register of Historic Places in Umatilla County, Oregon
Odd Fellows buildings in Oregon